Kamaura Shahid Smriti High School (KSSHS) is a secondary school in Ashuganj Upazila of Brahmanbaria District, Bangladesh.

History
Time has witnessed the teachers and the students of KSSHS have started their journey with huge struggle in 1993. In January 1993 there was no room to start the class of its students; the authority had managed some a room of Kamaura Govt. Primary School and a Bangla Ghor of bashutara to start its classes. Even in 2000 many teachers has taken classes in rooms without fence. Though there were many infrastructural limitations but the teachers and the authority were very much sincere about the quality of education from the very beginning of this institution.

Alumni
KSSHS Alumni Association fosters a lifelong spirit of belonging and pride by connecting alumni, students, and friends to KSSHS. The Alumni Association advocates for the school and its alumni with a credible, independent, and collaborative voice.

References

External links
 Facebook Page
 Alumni Facebook Page

High schools in Bangladesh